Platygyriella imbricatifolia is a species of moss belonging to the genus Platygyriella. Before being named Platygyriella imbricatifolia, it was placed in the genus Erythrodontium by R.S. Williams and Jules Cardot. It was then transferred to the genus Platygyriella by Marie Hypolite Irénée Thériot in 1926.

References

Hypnaceae
Plants described in 1926
Taxa named by Jules Cardot